John Gilkerson (born May 6, 1985 in Winchester, Virginia) is an American soccer player.

Career

College and amateur
Gilkerson was a standout defender during his college career at Winthrop University. He was named to the All-Big South first team in his junior and senior years. In 2006, he was named to the NSCAA All-South Atlantic Region Team. In 2007 Gilkerson started in all of the Eagles’ 18 regular-season games, collecting one goal and two assists while leading a defense that conceded only 13 goals all season. Gilkerson, who has also played for the Virginia Beach Submariners and Hampton Roads Piranhas (Premier Development League), helped guide a Winthrop defense that earned a 0.73 goals-against average in 2006, good for 16th in the nation.

Professional
Following his senior season he was drafted by Red Bull New York with the 35th pick in the 2008 MLS Supplemental Draft. After spending part of 2008 out on loan at Richmond Kickers of the USL Second Division, Gilkerson made his full professional debut for the Red Bulls on 1 July 2008, in a US Open Cup third-round game against Crystal Palace Baltimore.

In January 2009, he signed with the Carolina RailHawks in the USL First Division and stayed with the club through the 2010 season.

Gilkerson signed with NSC Minnesota Stars of the North American Soccer League on March 15, 2011. He was released by the club on November 29, 2011.

References

External links
Carolina RailHawks bio
Winthrop bio
Infosport Combine profile

1985 births
Living people
American soccer players
Winthrop Eagles men's soccer players
North Carolina FC players
Virginia Beach Piranhas players
New York Red Bulls players
Richmond Kickers players
Minnesota United FC (2010–2016) players
USL League Two players
USL First Division players
USL Second Division players
USSF Division 2 Professional League players
North American Soccer League players
Soccer players from Virginia
New York Red Bulls draft picks
Association football defenders